Majkin Airport is a public use airstrip at Majkin on Namu Atoll, Marshall Islands.

Airlines and destinations

References

Airports in the Marshall Islands